Sverdlovsky District may refer to:
Sverdlov District, Bishkek (Sverdlovsky District), a city district of Bishkek, Kyrgyzstan
Sverdlovsky District, Russia, several districts and city districts in Russia
Sverdlovsk Raion (Sverdlovsky District), a district of Luhansk Oblast, Ukraine

See also
Sverdlovsky (disambiguation)
Sverdlovsk (disambiguation)
Sverdlov (disambiguation)